Salix pedicellaris, the bog willow, is a species of willow. It grows as a shrub.

Conservation status in the United States
It is listed as endangered in Connecticut by state authorities. It is also listed as endangered in New Jersey, Ohio, and Pennsylvania. It is listed as threatened in Iowa, and is listed as "historical" in Rhode Island.

Photographs

References

Flora of North America
pedicellaris